Alex Cappa (born January 27, 1995) is an American football guard for the Cincinnati Bengals of the National Football League (NFL). He played college football at Humboldt State. He was selected in the third round of the 2018 NFL Draft by the Tampa Bay Buccaneers.

College career
During Cappa's time at Humboldt State, he was named the GNAC offensive lineman of the year for 4 years in a row.  He was also named to the First-team GNAC every year of his playing career.  Following his senior season, Cappa was invited to the 2018 Senior Bowl.

Professional career

On November 27, 2017, Cappa accepted his invitation to play in the Senior Bowl. He impressed scouts and NFL analysts with a strong week of practice before the Senior Bowl and helped solidify his draft stock. On January 27, 2018, Cappa played in the 2018 Reese's Senior Bowl and was part of Houston Texans' head coach Bill O'Brien's South team that won 45–16 to Denver Broncos' head coach Vance Joseph's North team. He attended the NFL Scouting Combine in Indianapolis and completed all of the combine and positional drills.

At the conclusion of the pre-draft process, Cappa was projected to be a fifth round pick by the majority of NFL draft experts and scouts. He was ranked as the 14th best offensive tackle prospect in the draft by DraftScout.com and was ranked the 15th best offensive tackle by Scouts Inc.

Tampa Bay Buccaneers
The Tampa Bay Buccaneers selected Cappa in the third round with the 94th overall pick in the 2018 NFL Draft. The Buccaneers traded their fourth (102nd overall) and sixth round picks (180th overall) in the 2018 NFL Draft to the Minnesota Vikings in exchange for the Vikings' third round pick to draft Cappa. Cappa was the 12th offensive tackle drafted in 2018 and became Humboldt State's highest draft selection in school history. He also holds the distinction of being Humboldt State's 11th player drafted and the first player selected in the NFL Draft since Freeman Baysinger in 1992, as well as being the final player drafted from Humboldt State as the school discontinued its football program after 2018.

On May 13, 2018, the Tampa Bay Buccaneers signed Cappa to a four-year, $3.36 million contract that includes a signing bonus of $793,704. As a rookie, Cappa appeared in six games, all at the end of the regular season.

Cappa made his first career start in the 2019 regular season opener against the San Francisco 49ers. In a game against the New Orleans Saints on October 6, 2019, Cappa suffered a broken left arm but did not miss a snap after sustaining the injury in the second quarter.

During the COVID-19 outbreak Cappa was involved with supporting local restaurants and businesses.

On January 9, 2021, in the Wild Card Round against the Washington Football Team, Cappa suffered a fractured ankle. On January 15, 2021, Cappa was placed on injured reserve due to the injury. The Buccaneers went on to win Super Bowl LV.

Cincinnati Bengals
Cappa signed a four-year, $35 million contract with the Cincinnati Bengals on March 18, 2022. Cappa started in all 17 regular season games for Cincinnati in 2022, helping the team to a 12-4 record, but he incurred an ankle injury during the finale against the Baltimore Ravens. Cappa did not return for the postseason run, in which the Bengals lost the AFC Championship game to the Kansas City Chiefs.

References

External links
 Humboldt State Lumberjacks football bio
 Tampa Bay Buccaneers bio

1995 births
Living people
American football offensive tackles
Humboldt State Lumberjacks football players
People from Dublin, California
American people of Italian descent
Players of American football from California
Sportspeople from Alameda County, California
Tampa Bay Buccaneers players
Cincinnati Bengals players